Bogorodsky District is the name of several administrative and municipal districts in Russia.

Modern districts
Bogorodsky District, Kirov Oblast, an administrative and municipal district of Kirov Oblast
Bogorodsky District, Nizhny Novgorod Oblast, an administrative and municipal district of Nizhny Novgorod Oblast

Historical districts
Bogorodsky District, Ural Oblast (1924–1931), a district of Ural Oblast of the Russian SFSR, Soviet Union

See also
Bogorodsky (disambiguation)

References